Visitation is a studio album by American jazz bassist Sam Jones which was recorded in March, 1978 for the Danish SteepleChase Records label. This is his ninth album as a leader. The record was re-released on CD in 1994 and as an LP in 2014 with three bonus tracks.

Reception
Ken Dryden of Allmusic noted "this 1978 session, just a few years prior to his premature death, finds him leading a powerful post-bop quintet, his regular group at the time, with cornetist Terumasa Hino, tenor saxophonist Bob Berg, pianist Ronnie Mathews, and drummer Al Foster. Jones primarily plays a supporting role through a good part of the date, though he is prominently featured in the interpretation of Paul Chambers' "Visitation," while he also revisits his breezy bop vehicle "Del Sasser." Reviewer of Jazz Journal wrote "this latest album by Sam Jones is well up to standard....an excellent band....As for Sam Jones, he is in splendid form on all tracks, perhaps inspired by the feeling that he has managed to gather about him a cracking good band."

Track listing

Personnel
Band
Ronnie Mathews – baby grand piano
Sam Jones – bass
Terumasa Hino – cornet 
Al Foster – drums 
Bob Berg – tenor saxophone

Production
Per Grunnet – cover
Jørgen Frigård – liner notes
Freddy Hansson – mixing 
Nils Winther – producer, photography 
Elvin Campbell – recording

References 

Sam Jones (musician) albums
1978 albums
SteepleChase Records albums